Fleur is a feminine given name originated in France, eventually used in English speaking countries and other languages. It means "flower" in French.

Notable people 

Fleur Adcock (born 1934), New Zealander poet and editor 
Fleur Agema (born 1976), Dutch politician
Fleur Anderson, British Labour politician
Fleur Beale (born 1945), New Zealand teenage fiction writer
Fleur Bennett (born 1970), British television actress
Fleur Cowles (1908–2009), American writer and editor
Fleur East (born 1987), British singer and contestant on The X Factor
Fleur Ezekiel (fl.1959), Indian model, first Indian Miss World contestant
Fleur Faure (born 1993), French cyclist
Fleur Hassan-Nahoum (born 1973), Israeli politician
Fleur Jaeggy (born 1940), Swiss writer (in Italian)
Fleur van de Kieft (born 1973), Dutch field hockey player
Fleur Lombard (1974–1996), British firefighter and first female firefighter to die on duty in peacetime
Fleur Maxwell (born 1988), Luxembourgian figure skater
Fleur Mellor (born 1936), Australian track and field runner and Olympic champion
Fleur Mino, French soprano
Fleur Pellerin (born 1973), French politician
Fleur Savelkoel (born 1995), Dutch volleyball player
Fleur Saville (born 1984), New Zealander television actress
Fleur van Eeden (born 1983), South African stunt performer
Fleur van der Weel (born 1970), Dutch illustrator

Fictional characters
Fleur Delacour, fictional character in the Harry Potter series
Fleur Forsyte, a fictional character in The Forsyte Saga
Fleur Blanc, a fictional character in Eureka Seven: AO
The Groovy Girls doll line, by Manhattan Toy, includes a doll named Fleur.

See also
Flower (name), surname and given name
Flowers (name), surname
Flora (given name)
Tzitzak, Khazar princess and Byzantine Empress whose name meant "flower"

Dutch feminine given names
English feminine given names
French feminine given names
Given names derived from plants or flowers